Hoseah (Hoss) Tsjale (born 6 June 1954) is a South African ultra-marathon runner.

Early life

He was brought up in Johannesburg, South Africa. As a black South African he was only allowed to participate in road running in 1975 when races were open for all races.

Running career
He won the Two Oceans Marathon, an ultra-Marathon (56 km), in 1980. He came second in the Comrades Marathon, an ultra-Marathon (90 km), in 1985 and 1990 and came 3rd in 1986 and 1987. He participated in the London to Brighton ultra-marathon (56 Miles), which he won in 1985.

Amateur

As an amateur he never received any money for his winnings.

Recognition

Sello Mokoena and Bruce Fordyce describe him as a best competitor to participate in the Comrades Marathon.

References

External links
 http://www.comrades.com/
 http://www.twooceansmarathon.org.za/

1954 births
Living people
South African male marathon runners
South African ultramarathon runners